"Floating Through Space" is a song by Australian singer-songwriter Sia and French DJ David Guetta. It was released on 4 February 2021 by Monkey Puzzle and Atlantic Records as the first promotional single from Sia's ninth studio album Music – Songs from and Inspired by the Motion Picture, and was later released as a single.

Background and release 
Sia announced the release of "Floating Through Space" on 3 February 2021, the day before it was released. Originally released as a promotional single, it was serviced to contemporary hit radio in Italy on 19 February 2021. It is Sia's seventh song with Guetta to be released as an official single, following "Titanium", "She Wolf (Falling to Pieces)", "Bang My Head", "Helium", "Flames" and "Let's Love", and tenth collaboration overall.

Composition 
Written by Sia and frequent collaborator Greg Kurstin, "Floating Through Space" is a dance-pop song which features electric, upbeat synths. It has an uplifting atmosphere and inspiring, simple lyrics; "You made it through another day" is repeated throughout the track. The song bears more resemblance to Sia's style of pop music than her previous collaborations with David Guetta.

Music video

Standard 
A music video, directed by Lior Molcho, was released alongside the song on 4 February 2021. In the video, three skateboaders, each wearing one of Sia's signature black-and-white wigs, obscuring their eyes, show off their moves at a skatepark.

Credits 
Music video credits adapted from YouTube.

 Lior Molcho – director
 Danit Sigler – cinematographer, editor
 Chen Biton – producer
 Stephanie Sosa – line producer
 Deven MacNair – stunt coordinator
 Tali Litmanovitz – second camera
 Janthavy Norton – skateboarder
 Cory Mcmillin – skateboarder
 Bryan McGowan – skateboarder

Collaboration with NASA 
In April 2021, Sia collaborated with NASA for a music video of the track celebrating the first flight of the Ingenuity Mars helicopter. The video features footage of NASA researchers and engineers working and testing the helicopter, as well as the Perseverance mission, and includes facts explaining what is happening.

Credits and personnel 

Credits adapted from Tidal and liner notes of Music.

 Sia Furler – writer, vocals
 Greg Kurstin – writer, producer, keyboards, engineer
 David Guetta – producer, mixer
 Mike Hawkins – producer
 Toby Green – producer
 Julian Burg – engineer

Charts

Weekly charts

Year-end charts

Certifications

Release history

Notes

References 

2021 singles
2021 songs
Atlantic Records singles
David Guetta songs
Sia (musician) songs
Song recordings produced by David Guetta
Song recordings produced by Greg Kurstin
Songs written by Greg Kurstin
Songs written by Sia (musician)